Brocchinia prismatica is a species of plant in the genus Brocchinia. This species is native to Venezuela.

References

prismatica
Endemic flora of Venezuela